Goose egg addling is a wildlife management method of population control for Canada geese and other bird species. The process of addling involves temporarily removing fertilized eggs from the nest, testing for embryo development, terminating embryo development, and placing the egg back in the nest. Returning the egg to the nest misleads the goose into believing the egg is still developing. Otherwise, the goose would begin laying again. 
 
In order to work effectively, addling must be conducted in a manner that does not arouse the suspicion of the goose, and must not change the odor, appearance or texture of the egg. Effective addling techniques are disseminated by the Humane Society of the United States and Internet Center for Wildlife Damage Management. Perhaps the easiest way to addle is to coat the egg with corn oil, thereby depriving the embryo of oxygen and killing it.

Canada geese are covered in the United States by the Migratory Bird Treaty Act of 1918. According to the Humane Society of the United States, the U.S. Fish and Wildlife Service no longer requires special permits to addle eggs in the contiguous United States, but one must register with the Service first (Resident Canada Goose Nest and Egg Registration Site).

Major implementation
Goose egg addling was predominantly used in the aftermath of the plane crash of US Airways Flight 1549 on January 15, 2009. Following an investigation by officials, which determined the plane crash was caused by a bird strike of Canada geese, an estimated 1,739 goose eggs were coated with oil in an effort to prevent any similar incidents from occurring.

References

External links
 Internet Center for Wildlife Damage Management
 Missouri Department of Conservation: Canada Goose Control
 Resident Canada Goose Nest and Egg Registration Site

Bird pest control
Ornithological equipment and methods

 U.S. Fish and Wildlife Service - Permit Information Page